Apocephalus coquilletti is a species of scuttle flies (insects in the family Phoridae).

References

Phoridae
Articles created by Qbugbot
Insects described in 1912
Diptera of North America
Taxa named by John Russell Malloch